Alice Low may refer to:
 Alice Low (suffragist) (1877–1954), British suffragist
 Alice Low (1926–2012), American author, lyricist, and editor

See also 
 Alice Lowe (born 1977), English actress, writer, and comedian